The 1987–88 NBA season was Indiana's 12th season in the NBA and 21st season as a franchise. This season saw the team draft Reggie Miller out of UCLA with the eleventh pick in the 1987 NBA draft. The Pacers finished sixth in the Central Division, and ninth in the Eastern Conference with a 38–44 record, losing a tie-breaker for the final playoff spot to the New York Knicks, and the Washington Bullets.

Offseason

Draft picks

Roster

Regular season

Season standings

z - clinched division title
y - clinched division title
x - clinched playoff spot

Record vs. opponents

Game log

Regular season

|- style="background:#cfc;"
| 3
| November 10, 19877:30 PM EST
| Detroit
| W 121–118
|
|
|
| Market Square Arena11,885
| 2–1

|-style="background:#fcc;"
| 26
| December 30, 19877:30 PM EST
| Detroit
| L 95–105
|
|
|
| Market Square Arena12,945
| 13–13

|-style="background:#fcc;"
| 30
| January 9, 19887:30 PM EST
| L.A. Lakers
| L 98–101
|
|
|
| Market Square Arena16,912
| 15–15
|-style="background:#fcc;"
| 40
| January 27, 19887:30 PM EST
| @ Detroit
| L 86–103
|
|
|
| Pontiac Silverdome19,801
| 20–20

|- style="background:#cfc;"
| 45
| February 9, 198810:30 PM EST
| @ L.A. Lakers
| W 110–108
|
|
|
| The Forum17,505
| 23–22

|- style="background:#cfc;"
| 59
| March 8, 19887:30 PM EST
| Detroit
| W 117–104
|
|
|
| Market Square Arena13,220
| 30–29
|-style="background:#fcc;"
| 66
| March 22, 19887:30 PM EST
| @ Detroit
| L 104–123
|
|
|
| Pontiac Silverdome18,645
| 32–34

|- style="background:#cfc;"
| 81
| April 22, 19887:30 PM EST
| @ Detroit
| W 103–98
|
|
|
| Pontiac Silverdome27,881
| 38–43

Player statistics

Season

Player Statistics Citation:

Awards and records

Transactions

References

See also
 1987-88 NBA season

Indiana Pacers seasons
Indiana
Indiana
Indiana